Ekho may refer to:
Ekho (mythology), a nymph in Greek mythology
Ekho (band), an Israeli metal band
Ekho Moskvy, a Russian radio station
Ekho Mountain, in Antarctica

See also 
 Echo (disambiguation)